Acula Municipality is a municipality in Veracruz, Mexico. It is located about 230 km south-east from the state capital of Xalapa.

Borders
Acula Municipality is delimited to the east by the Tlacotalpan Municipality, to the south by the Amatitlán Municipality, to the west by the Ignacio de la Llave Municipality, and to the north by Alvarado Municipality.

Products
It produces maize, rice, bean, mango and sugar cane.

References

External links 
  Municipal Official Site
  Municipal Official Information

Municipalities of Veracruz